The 2022 Southern Conference baseball tournament was held from May 25 through 29 at Fluor Field at the West End in Greenville, South Carolina.  The annual event determines the conference champion of the Division I Southern Conference in college baseball.  The tournament winner earns the league's bid to the 2022 NCAA Division I baseball tournament.  This is the last of 20 athletic championships held by the conference in the 2021–22 academic year.

The tournament was originally held from 1950 to 1953, when the Southern Conference was a large conference composed of several small schools and several large schools, the latter of which would form the Atlantic Coast Conference after the 1953 season.  The event was re-established in 1984 and has been held every year since with the exception of 2020 when the COVID-19 pandemic cancelled sporting events across the country.  Western Carolina has claimed ten championships, the most of any school, with The Citadel close behind at eight tournament wins.  Defending champion Samford has three championships, while Mercer has won two.  East Tennessee State and VMI have never won a title, although they both returned to the conference in 2015 after over ten years in other conferences.  Furman, which dropped its baseball program before the 2021 season, won two titles.

The tournament will be played in Greenville, which has hosted eight of the past twelve events, including the past five.

Seeding and format
After only including four teams in 2021, the 2022 tournament will return to the previous format.  All eight teams will participate in the tournament, with the bottom four seeds playing a single-elimination play-in round.  The winners of the single elimination games will join the top 4 teams in the double-elimination tournament.  The #3 and #4 seeds will play the winners of the single elimination games in the second round.  The #1 and #2 seeds have a bye until the third round where they will play the winners of the second round.  The championship will be a double elimination.

Bracket

Schedule

References

2022 Southern Conference baseball season
Southern Conference Baseball Tournament
SoCon baseball tournament
Baseball competitions in Greenville, South Carolina
College baseball tournaments in South Carolina